Varstu Parish was a rural municipality of Estonia, in Võru County. It had a population of 1,272 (as of 1 January 2009) and an area of 170.63 km².

In 2017, it merged with Rõuge Parish, Haanja Parish, Mõniste Parish, and Misso Parish to create a new entity. It retained the Rõuge Parish name.

Settlements
Small borough
Varstu
Villages
Hintsiko - Kangsti - Kõrgepalu - Krabi - Laurimäe - Liguri - Lüütsepa - Matsi - Metstaga - Mutemetsa - Paganamaa - Pähni - Punsa - Raudsepa - Soolätte - Tagakolga - Vana-Roosa - Viru

References

External links
 

Former municipalities of Estonia